Handy billy — also known as Handy-billie —is an emergency portable pump that for decades was commonly placed aboard most U.S. Navy ships from World War I on, as well as later use on civilian craft.

Purpose of the pump 

The handy billy, formally designated "P50", because it pumped 50 gallons per minute, was gasoline-powered and could be used, during flooding conditions, in conjunction with other pumps on the ship. However, it was especially valuable when the ship lost electrical power and normal pumping ability was lost.

On smaller ships, it was a critical piece of equipment.

The pump gained its name because it was very “handy” and dependable. It was especially handy because it could be easily transported from place to place by two strong crew members, one at each end, as it weighed 160 pounds during World War II.

Versatility 

The handy billy could be used for fire-fighting and/or pumping water from flooded spaces aboard ship.

Example of use 

See

See also 

 Pump

References

External links
 USS ATLANTA CL-51 - Battle damage during evening of 12 November 1942 
 Abandonment of the "Duncan" and Rescue of Her Survivors by the "McCalla" 
 Fire pump aboard ship to pump sea water.

Nautical terminology
Pumps